Lino Pertile (born 1940) is an Italian linguist, Professor of Romance Languages and Literatures at Harvard University. He served as House Master of Eliot House for 10 years, stepping down in 2010. Born in Italy near Padua, he taught at the universities of Reading, Sussex and Edinburgh, prior to moving on to Harvard.

His specialty is Dante scholarship, a field in which he has published widely. Pertile also studies the Italian 20th-century novel. In 2005, he was named Harvard College Professor, a special teaching recognition awarded to those faculty members who have most invested their time and energy in teaching undergraduates. It was announced on December 16, 2009, that Pertile would become the new director of Villa I Tatti, the Harvard University Center for Italian Renaissance Studies, in summer 2010 and served in that position until 2015. Pertile has served on the Board of Editors for the Dante Society of America.

References

External links
Lino Pertile's faculty profile on Harvard University website

1940 births
Living people
Writers from Padua
Harvard University faculty
Linguists from Italy
Italian expatriates in the United Kingdom
Italian expatriates in the United States